Barbara Stephens may refer to:

 Barbara Stephens (singer) (born 1939), American singer
 Barbara Stephens (journalist) (1922–1947), American journalist killed in Xinjiang province, China
Barbara Stephens (actress) in Bonjour Balwyn
Barbara Stephens on List of Home and Away characters (1988)
Barbara Stephens, victim of the Flat-Tire murders

See also
Barbara Stevens (disambiguation)
Barbara Stephen, English educational writer